Ancestor is a public art work by artist Masayuki Nagare located at the Lynden Sculpture Garden near Milwaukee, Wisconsin. The abstract black granite sculpture has some highly polished surfaces and some which remain rough; it is installed on the lawn.

References

1965 sculptures
Outdoor sculptures in Milwaukee
Granite sculptures in Wisconsin